Dverberg is a small village in Andøy Municipality in Nordland county, Norway. The village of Dverberg is also called Myre. Dverberg Church is a wooden, octagonal church built in 1843, located on the north end of the village.

As of 2010, the village of Dverberg/Myre had around 250 inhabitants.

Notable residents
Torstein Raaby (1918-1964),  Norwegian resistance fighter and explorer

References

External links
Fiskerbautaen - Dverberg
Minnebauta over Augustinus Sellevold

Andøy
Villages in Nordland
Populated places of Arctic Norway